MidKent College (formerly Mid-Kent College of Higher and Further Education) is a further education college in Kent, England. It runs courses from two separate campuses in Maidstone and Medway, including a number of higher education courses.

There are approximately 8,500 students aged 16 years and upwards enrolled at the college.  Courses offered range from pre-entry level to degree level and cover a wide range of vocational and academic subject areas.

Campuses 
The college has two main campuses: the Medway Campus in Gillingham and the Maidstone Campus (formerly the Oakwood Park Centre).

In September 2009 all courses at the old sites of the Horsted Centre in Chatham and the City Way Centre in Rochester were moved to a new combined campus on Prince Arthur Road in Gillingham. The new campus, which received more than £40 million of Learning and Skills Council (LSC) funding, cost a total of £86million. It offers training facilities in a range of subject areas including construction, performing arts, music and catering.

The Medway Campus was officially opened by The Princess Royal on Thursday 25 March 2010.

In late 2012 work started on a £22 million refurbishment of the Maidstone Campus to bring its facilities up to the standard of the Medway Campus. The wider development of the Maidstone Campus also includes a refurbishment of the University for the Creative Arts' Maidstone campus – also located at Oakwood Park – which was purchased by the College in 2011.

In 2014 both City Way and Horsted centres were demolished.

History 

The college has been delivering vocational education in Medway and Maidstone for nearly 100 years. Its roots lie in the technical institutes established within the Medway towns in the 1890s and Maidstone around 1918.

The college first began delivering courses from the Horsted Centre in Chatham in 1954. The site was opened as Medway College of Technology by the Duke of Edinburgh on 5 April the following year.

Medway College of Technology and Maidstone Technical College amalgamated in 1966 to become Medway and Maidstone College of Technology. The purpose-built City Way site in Rochester was subsequently opened as an additional college site in 1968.

The college changed its name to Mid-Kent College of Higher and Further Education in 1978, before dropping the hyphen and space and the latter part of its title to become MidKent College in October 2008.

Throughout the 1950s, 60s and 70s, the college's students were famed for their Rag Day parade. This saw them conducting a carnival procession through the Medway Towns. The parade started at Gillingham train station and ended at the esplanade in Rochester. Each year the students elected their own "Rag Day Queen" to head the procession.

Principal 

The current principal of MidKent College is Simon Cook, who has held the position since July 2014 after the sad death of principal Sue McLeod.

The mother-of-one had previously worked across the Caribbean, United States and Europe during her time in the travel industry, including a stint aboard cruise liners. She had earlier achieved a degree in Business Studies at the Dorset Institute of Higher Education – now Bournemouth University – where she returned to study Travel and Tourism prior to embarking on her teaching career with MidKent College.

In 2014 Sue McLeod was diagnosed with a brain tumour. On 24 July 2014, MidKent College informed the public via social media that she had died, the statement stated "It is with great sadness that MidKent College announces the death of its much-loved principal Sue McLeod at the age of 53."

Chief Executive 

The current chief executive of MidKent College is Simon Cook, who has held the position since the retirement of previous CEO, Stephen Grix, in July 2016.

Mr Grix first joined the College in 1971 when, having left school at age 15 with no formal qualifications, he enrolled as a day-release bricklaying student at the old Horsted site in Chatham. After 13 years in the trade he returned to study an education degree, followed by a master's degree in education management.

The father-of-three eventually went on to become principal of Sir George Monoux College in Walthamstow, north-east London, and then head of Ofsted's post-compulsory education division. Next was a role as director of education for the London borough of Tower Hamlets before Mr Grix returned to MidKent College as principal and chief executive in March 2005.

Once back at the place where he launched his career, Mr Grix took on the mammoth task of closing the College's dated Horsted and City Way sites and identifying funding opportunities for the new £86 million Medway Campus, which opened in 2009. He then turned his attention to improving the Maidstone Campus, which is currently undergoing a £23m redevelopment due for completion in December 2013.

In January 2013, Mr Grix announced he would step down as principal at the end of the academic year but continue as chief executive on a part-time basis until 2015. He was succeeded as principal by his former deputy Sue McLeod.

In June 2013 Mr Grix was appointed an OBE for services to further education in The Queen's Birthday Honours List.

Mr Grix is also an executive director of MKC Training Services Ltd, which administers the College's contract to deliver training within the Royal School of Military Engineering at Brompton Barracks.

Affiliations 

MidKent College became an associate college of the University of Kent in 2001. The University of Kent validates the college’s higher education programmes.

Notable alumni 

Caroline Feraday, television and radio broadcaster
Mo Abudu, African businesswoman and television personality
Kat Driscoll, Olympic trampolinist
Jack Green, Olympic hurdler
Matt Coles, England cricketer
Charlotte Evans, Winter Paralympic gold medalist

References

External links 
MidKent College website
Medway Mag Online

 

Further education colleges in Kent
Rochester, Kent
Education in Medway
Borough of Maidstone